Damon Revelle Canfield (September 21, 1897 – August 14, 1992) was an American politician in the state of Washington. He served in the Washington House of Representatives from 1953 to 1967 and in the Senate from 1967 to 1975.

References

1992 deaths
1897 births
Republican Party Washington (state) state senators
Republican Party members of the Washington House of Representatives
20th-century American politicians